Aspen Creek Grill (formerly Aspen Creek) is a restaurant chain with 8 locations.

Aspen Creek's menu centers on pizza, salads, chicken, pasta, and seafood.

Aspen Creek restaurants are located in Louisville, Kentucky and Noblesville, Indiana, as well as Amarillo, Irving, Lubbock, and San Antonio in Texas.

History 
The first Aspen Creek restaurant was opened in the Louisville suburb of Fern Creek, on February 24, 2009.  As its name implies, the store's design is much like a mountain lodge found around Aspen.

It was previously owned by Texas Roadhouse.

References

Further reading 
Nation's Restaurant News 
WDRB News
Star-Telegram
Dallas Morning News
Become A Pitmaster

External links 
 

Restaurants in Louisville, Kentucky
Restaurants established in 2009
Restaurants in North Carolina
Restaurants in Texas
2009 establishments in Kentucky